José Díaz (born 31 March 1963, in Valencia) is a former Spanish rugby union player. He played as a flanker.

Díaz played for Castres Olympique, in France, from 1986/87 to 2001/02, winning the French Championship in 1992/93 who beat Grenoble 14-11 in the final, in a match decided by an irregular try accorded by the referee, being a runners-up in 1994/95, and also the Cup of France, in 1992/93.

He had 10 caps for Spain, from 1997 to 1999, scoring 1 try, 5 points in aggregate. He was selected for the 1999 Rugby World Cup, playing in all the three games.

References

External links
José Díaz International Statistics

1963 births
Living people
Spanish rugby union players
Spain international rugby union players
Rugby union flankers
Spanish expatriate rugby union players
Spanish expatriate sportspeople in France
Expatriate rugby union players in France